The Eames House (also known as Case Study House No. 8) is a landmark of mid-20th century modern architecture located at 203 North Chautauqua Boulevard in the Pacific Palisades neighborhood of Los Angeles. It was constructed in 1949, by husband-and-wife design pioneers Charles and Ray Eames, to serve as their home and studio. The house was commissioned by Arts & Architecture magazine as part of its Case Study House program, challenging architects to design progressive, but modest, homes in Southern California. Charles and Ray moved into the home on Christmas Eve in 1949 and never moved out (Charles died in August 1978 and Ray died in August 1988). Charles's daughter, Lucia Eames, inherited the home and created the non-profit organization, the Eames Foundation, in 2004. Still a historic house museum maintained by the Eames Foundation, it was designated a National Historic Landmark in 2006 and serves as a pilgrimage site for nearly 20,000 visitors a year (reservations are required).

Design and history

In the early 1940s, John Entenza, the owner of Arts & Architecture magazine and Case Study Program founder, purchased 5 acres of land on a wooded bluff that was once part of Will Rogers' large estate. He sold 1.4 acres of this land to Charles and Ray in 1945. Their home's design was first sketched out by Charles Eames with fellow architect Eero Saarinen in 1945 as a raised steel and glass box projecting out of the slope and spanning the entrance drive before cantilevering dramatically over the front yard. The structure was to be constructed entirely from "off-the-shelf" parts available from steel fabricator catalogs. Immediately after the war, though, these parts were in very short supply. By the time the materials arrived three years later, much pre-construction time had been spent picnicking at and exploring the lot where the house would stand. After a period of intense collaboration between Charles and Ray, the scheme was radically changed to sit more quietly in the land and avoid impinging upon the pleasant meadow that fronted the house. Although Eero Saarinen did not have any contribution to the Eames House as built, he did co-design the Entenza House (Case Study House #9) with Charles Eames next door for John Entenza.

The new Eames House design featured a residence building and a studio building tucked into the landscape's slope, with an 8-foot (2.4 m) tall by 200 foot (60 m) long concrete retaining wall. The lower level of the residence features a living room with alcove, hall with closets and spiral staircase, kitchen, and utility space. The upper level holds two bedrooms and overlooks the double-height living room in mezzanine fashion. The residence's second story also boasts two bathrooms, multiple hallways filled with aluminum closets, and a wire-embedded skylight. The studio building has a similar mezzanine, but is much shorter in length. The studio's ground floor features a utility sink, bathroom, dark room for processing photographs, and a large open space with double-volume height. The upper floor was primarily used as storage, but occasionally became guest quarters. A courtyard was also introduced, separating the residence from the studio space. This revised scheme required only one additional beam. The 17 foot (5.1 m) tall facade is broken down into a rigidly geometric composition of brightly colored and neutral-colored panels between thin steel columns and braces, painted "a warm grey". Over time, painting schemes allowed the grey to become black. The entry door is marked with a gold-leaf panel above. Planted in the 1880s by Abbot Kinney, an existing row of eucalyptus trees was preserved along the exposed wall of the house, providing some shading and a visual contrast with the house's bold facade.

As for the interior design, the Eameses' collection includes, among others: an Isamu Noguchi floor lamps, folk and Abstract Expressionist art, Japanese kokeshi dolls, Chinese lacquered pillows, Native American baskets, Thonet chairs, and numerous Eames furniture designs (some of which never made it past the prototype stage). The maximalist interiors were grouped by the Eameses in idiosyncratic tableaux and the home's interior decorating has sparked conversation of the Eameses "humanizing" modernism.

Of the twenty-five Case Study Houses built, the Eames house is considered the most successful both as an architectural statement and as a comfortable, functional living space. The brash sleekness of the design made it a favorite backdrop for fashion shoots in the 1950s and 1960s for publications such as Vogue. Perhaps the proof of its success in fulfilling its program is the fact that it remained at the center of the Eameses' life and work from the time they moved in (Christmas Eve 1949) until their deaths.

Eames House is one prominent architectural example with the influence of the De Stijl Movement outside Europe. The sliding walls and windows give it the trademark versatility and openness of the De Stijl Movement.

After the Eameses died, the house was largely unchanged.

The Eames Foundation
The Eames House is operated by The Eames Foundation, a non-profit foundation established in 2004 by Lucia Eames, Charles Eames's daughter from his first marriage. The Eames Foundation's corporate sponsors are the Eames Office, Herman Miller, and Vitra. On September 20, 2006, the Eames House was designated a National Historic Landmark (and administratively listed on the National Register of Historic Places the same day). In 2011, the contents of the living room were reassembled at the Los Angeles County Museum of Art as a centerpiece of the exhibition "California Design, 1930-1965: Living in a Modern Way".

Also in 2011, the Eames Foundation hired Los Angeles architectural firm Escher GuneWardena to develop a plan for the house, one that would restore and preserve the house as it was in 1988. In 2012, the Getty Conservation Institute pledged about $250,000 to preservation-related research work at the Eames House. In 2013, the Eames Foundation teamed up with the digital marketing agency Nebo to produce limited-edition prints for auction with a goal of raising $150,000; every donation will be matched by an Authenticity Fund created by modern furniture manufacturers Herman Miller and Vitra.

Lucia Eames died in 2014, leaving her five children as the Board of Directors of the Eames Foundation. Together, with the help of staff and docents, they oversee the ownership, conservation, and visitor services of the two structures, landscaping, and Charles and Ray's belongings. The Eames Foundation's 250 Year Project hopes to conserve and care for the home for 250 years into the future.

The Eames House is open to the public five days a week for reservations, which include exterior self-guided visits, private interior tours, picnics, events, and more.

Literature
In February 2010 LAS Magazine posted an article about the building's history and current significance to the Eames Century Modern Collection, a typography project by design studio House Industries.

In April 2019, the Getty Conservation Institute released the Conservation Management Plan (CMP) of the Eames House. This publication spanned over 200 pages and featured Eames House history, current use of the property, potential damage and ecological risks, and mitigations for conservation. This publication will aid the Eames Foundation's 250 Year Project for conservation and serves as a tool for other stewards of modern architecture around the globe.

See also
 List of National Historic Landmarks in California
 List of Registered Historic Places in Los Angeles
 List of Los Angeles Historic-Cultural Monuments on the Westside

References

Further reading

External links

Official Eames Foundation website
National Historic Landmarks Program: Eames House

Arts & Architecture magazine
A Designer's Home of His Own Life magazine. 11 September 1950. page 148.

Works by Charles and Ray Eames
Houses completed in 1949
Houses on the National Register of Historic Places in Los Angeles
California Historical Landmarks
Los Angeles Historic-Cultural Monuments
National Historic Landmarks in California
Pacific Palisades, Los Angeles
Modernist architecture in California
Historic house museums in California
Museums in Los Angeles